This is a list of 104 species in the genus Bledius.

Bledius species

References

Bledius